Daniel Granger may refer to:

 Daniel L. D. Granger (1852–1909), U.S. Representative from Rhode Island
 Daniel Granger (Doctors), a fictional character in the British soap opera Doctors